Douglas G. Greene (born September 24,1944) is an American historian, editor, and author.  He is the son of Margaret Chindahl Greene and the Reverend George L. Greene, He is married to Sandi Greene with whom he has a son, Eric and a daughter, Katherine, and has an identical twin, David L. Greene, and a younger brother Paul.

Greene is Emeritus Professor of History at Old Dominion University, specialising in Tudor and Stuart Britain. He is a Charter Member of The International Wizard of Oz Club, founded in 1957, and he was a frequent contributor to The Baum Bugle.  He is co-author of a biography of Oz illustrator W. W. Denslow and co-editor of stories and poems by Oz author Ruth Plumly Thompson.  He was co-owner and editor of mystery publisher Crippen & Landru through 2017, continuing as senior editor beginning in 2018, and has edited numerous Mystery fiction collections for both his own and other publishing houses.  In 2014, the non-fiction anthology Mysteries Unlocked: Essays in Honor of Douglas G. Greene was released to celebrate his 70th birthday, with ten Edgar Award winning or nominated authors among those contributing. Greene's biography John Dickson Carr: The Man Who Explained Miracles was nominated in 1996 for the Edgar Award Best Critical / Biographical Work.

Awards
1965 - The L. Frank Baum Memorial Award from The International Wizard of Oz Club
2001 - The Ellery Queen Award from the Mystery Writers of America
2003 - The Malice Domestic Poirot Award
2003 - Baker Street Irregulars Distinguished Speaker
2007 - The George N. Dove Award from the Popular Culture Association for "serious study of mystery and crime fiction"
2016 - The Malice Domestic Amelia Award

Selected bibliography

Books written or edited by Douglas G. Greene:

1974 -  The Earl of Castlehaven's Memoirs of the Irish Wars
1976 - W. W. Denslow (with Michael Patrick Hearn)
1976 - Bibliographia Oziana (with Peter E. Hanff) revised edition, 1998.
1977 - Diaries of the Popish Plot
1978 - The Meditations of Lady Elizabeth Delaval
1980 - The Door to Doom and Other Detections
1983 - The Dead Sleep Lightly and Other Mysteries from Radio’s Golden Age
1985 - The Wizard of Way Up and Other Wonders (with James E. Haff)
1987 - Death Locked In, An Anthology of Locked Room Stories (with Robert Adey)
1989 - The Collected Short Fiction of Ngaio Marsh; reprinted as Alleyn and Others
1991 - Merrivale, March and Murder
1991 - Fell and Foul Play
1995 - John Dickson Carr: The Man Who Explained Miracles
1997 - Detection by Gaslight, The Great Victorian and Edwardian Detective Stories
1999 - The Dead Hand and other Uncollected Stories (with Tony Medawar)
1999 - Grand Guignol (in Japanese)
1999 - Classic Mystery Stories
2003 - Sissajig and Other Surprises (with Ruth Berman)
2003 - The Romance of the Secret Service Fund
2010 - The Adventures of Rogan Kincaid
2010 - The Complete Deteckative Memoirs of Philo Gubb, Esquire
2012 - Before the Fact
2014 - The Compleat Achievements of Luther Trant
2014 - The Compleat Adventures of Solange Fontaine
2015 - I Believe in Sherlock Holmes
2019 - The Cases of Lieutenant Timothy Trant (with Curtis Evans)
2020 - The Island of Coffins {with Tony Medawar}

References 

1944 births
Living people
21st-century American historians
American male non-fiction writers
21st-century American male writers